Market Center station is a DART Light Rail station in Dallas, Texas. The station opened as part of the Green Line's expansion in December 2010. It serves nearby locations such as the Infomart and Dallas Market Center and the Oak Lawn neighborhood.

References

External links 
Dallas Area Rapid Transit - Market Center Station

Dallas Area Rapid Transit light rail stations in Dallas
Railway stations in the United States opened in 2010
2010 establishments in Texas
Railway stations in Dallas County, Texas